Yun Chol (born 27 October 1972) is a North Korean former footballer. He represented North Korea on at least five occasions in 1990.

Career statistics

International

References

1972 births
Living people
North Korean footballers
North Korea international footballers
Association football midfielders
Pyongyang Sports Club players
Footballers at the 1990 Asian Games
Asian Games competitors for North Korea